George Iain Cooper (born 30 October 1996) is an English professional footballer who plays as a midfielder for Warrington Rylands. He started his career at Crewe Alexandra, having come through their academy.

Career

Crewe Alexandra
Cooper graduated through the Crewe Alexandra Academy to sign a three-year professional contract in April 2014. Aged 17, he made his first team debut for Crewe Alexandra on 2 September 2014, replacing Bradden Inman 71 minutes into a 3–0 defeat to Rochdale in a Football League Trophy first round match. On 26 September 2014, Cooper made his first league appearance for Crewe Alexandra in a 6–1 defeat at the hands of Milton Keynes Dons. On 11 October 2014, he scored his first goal for Crewe in a 2–1 victory over Coventry City.

In April 2017, Crewe triggered a contract extension clause keeping Cooper at Crewe until June 2018.

Peterborough United
In January 2018, he signed for Peterborough United on a three-and-a-half year contract for an undisclosed fee. He scored on his Peterborough debut, in a 3–0 win against Oldham Athletic.

Plymouth Argyle (loan)
On 29 August 2019, Cooper joined League Two side Plymouth Argyle on a season-long loan deal. He played the majority of the season at left wing-back, and finished the season with a recorded 12 assists, as Argyle were promoted to League One.

Upon his return to Peterborough, Cooper was transfer-listed and left out of Posh's 'Salary Cap Squad', along with George Boyd, Jason Naismith and Louis Reed.

Plymouth Argyle
On 2 September 2020, Cooper re-joined Argyle, this time permanently, for an undisclosed fee. He signed a three-year contract.

Chesterfield
On 27 June 2022, Cooper's contract at Plymouth Argyle was cancelled by mutual consent and he subsequently joined Chesterfield on a free transfer.

Warrington Rylands
On 24 February 2023, Cooper signed for Northern Premier League Premier Division club Warrington Rylands.

Career statistics

Honours
Individual
League One Apprentice Award: 2014–15

References

External links

George Cooper at My Football Data

1996 births
Living people
Footballers from Warrington
English footballers
Association football midfielders
Crewe Alexandra F.C. players
Peterborough United F.C. players
Plymouth Argyle F.C. players
Chesterfield F.C. players
Warrington Rylands 1906 F.C. players
English Football League players
National League (English football) players
Northern Premier League players